Jajpurattus is a spider genus of jumping spiders) found in India. Its single described species is Jajpurattus incertus.

Name
The genus name is combined from Jajpur and the common ending for salticid genera -attus.

References

  (2007): The world spider catalog, version 8.0. American Museum of Natural History.

Salticidae
Spiders of the Indian subcontinent
Monotypic Salticidae genera